Blériot Glacier is a short, but wide, glacier lying east of Salvesen Cove and Zimzelen Glacier and southwest of Cayley Glacier on Danco Coast, Graham Land in Antarctica. Photographed by the Falkland Islands and Dependencies Aerial Survey Expedition in 1956–57, and mapped from these photos by the Falkland Islands Dependencies Survey, it was named by the UK Antarctic Place-Names Committee in 1960 for Louis Blériot (1872–1936), a French aviator who in 1907 flew the first full-size powered monoplane, and who made the first flight across the English Channel in July 1909.

See also
 List of glaciers in the Antarctic
 Glaciology

References
 SCAR Composite Gazetteer of Antarctica.
 

Glaciers of Danco Coast